= Zen Anti-Drone System =

- Type: Counter-unmanned aircraft system
- Place of origin: India

Service history
- Used by: Indian Army, Indian Air Force

Production history
- Manufacturer: Zen Technologies

Zen Anti-Drone System (ZADS, or Zen ADS-HK in its hard-kill configuration) is a counter-unmanned aircraft system (C-UAS) manufactured by Zen Technologies, a defence company headquartered in Hyderabad, India.

== Design ==
The system uses radio-frequency detection, radar, and electro-optical and infrared cameras. Sensor data is processed at a central command unit to classify targets and direct responses. The radio-frequency detection unit monitors drone and ground station frequencies to estimate signal bearings, while optical cameras provide visual tracking.

System counter-measures are divided into soft-kill and hard-kill options. Soft-kill systems use radio-frequency jammers to interrupt communication and satellite navigation links. Hard-kill systems employ kinetic effectors, including remote weapon stations, lasers, and net-carrying interceptor drones. According to reporting on the 2024 deployment, the system has a baseline detection range of approximately 5 km and an effective jamming range of up to 4 km, depending on target size and altitude.

== Variants ==
The company produces the system in vehicle-mounted, man-portable, and fixed-site configurations.

The vehicle-mounted variant integrates detection hardware, jamming systems, remote weapon stations, and interceptor drones. Zen claims an engagement range of up to 20 km and target tracking capability in swarm scenarios, though these figures have not been independently verified. The man-portable model is designed for infantry patrol and counter-insurgency operations, while the fixed-site version is deployed at military installations and infrastructure sites for perimeter defense.

In May 2026, the company introduced an updated radar systems to counter swarm and first-person-view drone threats. This update included modified radar systems and command software.

== Procurement and deployment ==
The Indian Air Force first ordered the system in 2021, followed by additional Ministry of Defence orders in September 2023. The Army Air Defence College at Gopalpur received hard-kill variants in mid-2024. Between late 2025 and early 2026, the Ministry of Defence awarded Zen Technologies additional procurement and upgrade contracts totaling over ₹700 crore (US$76 million), covering counter-drone hardware, simulators, and software updates. The contracts followed operational deployments.
